Lan Fo'an (born June 1962) is a Chinese politician currently serving as CCP Secretary of Shanxi province. He is a member of the 19th Central Commission for Discipline Inspection. He is a delegate to the 19th National Congress of the Chinese Communist Party. He is a delegate to the 13th National People's Congress.

Career
Lan was born in Huidong County, Guangdong, in June 1962. After graduating from Hubei College of Finance and Economics (now Zhongnan University of Economics and Law) in 1985, he was dispatched to the Ministry of Finance of the People's Republic of China.

Beginning in November 1988, he served in several posts in the Guangdong Provincial Finance Department, including section member, principal staff member, and director. In March 1999, he was appointed vice mayor of Dongguan, but having held the position for only two-and-a-haif years. He moved back to the Guangdong Provincial Finance Department and was appointed its deputy head. In April 2007, he was promoted to party branch secretary of Guangdong Provincial Audit Department, concurrently holding the head position since March 2008. In March 2015, he was transferred to Shaoguan and appointed party secretary, the top political position in the city. He was promoted to vice governor of Guangdong in January 2016. 

In March 2017, he was transferred to the neighboring Hainan province, he was appointed secretary of its Commission for Discipline Inspection, the party's agency in charge of anti-corruption efforts. He also served as director of Hainan Provincial Supervisory Commission. He became a member of the Standing Committee of the CPC Hainan Provincial Committee.

In April 2021, he was transferred to north China's Shanxi province and appointed deputy party secretary. On June 4, he was named acting governor of Shanxi, replacing Lin Wu. In December, 2022, he was appointed secretary of the CPC Committee of Shanxi province.

References

1962 births
Living people
People from Huidong County, Guangdong
Zhongnan University of Economics and Law alumni
South China University of Technology alumni
Delegates to the 13th National People's Congress
People's Republic of China politicians from Guangdong
Chinese Communist Party politicians from Guangdong